Vartika Mathur (born 27 August 1979) is an Indian scientist who is a professor in the Department of Zoology, Sri Venkateswara College, University of Delhi. Mathur was the only Indian to receive the NFP fellowship in 2008 from Nuffic - an organization in partnership with Ministry of Education, Culture and Science (Netherlands) and Dutch Ministry of Foreign Affairs. This fellowship enabled her to pursue a PhD in Wageningen University and Research Centre. She worked in the Netherlands and India for four years and was awarded a PhD in 2012.

Mathur was awarded the European Mobility Grant for International Laureates by the International Doctoral College of the European University of Brittany (CDI-UEB) in 2010 to perform research in University of Rennes, France. She has been awarded the "Young Scientist of the year Award 2015" in the field of Chemical Ecology by the International Foundation of Environment and Ecology. Mathur is the host supervisor for a six-month Research Training Fellowship for Developing Country Scientists (RTF-DCS). Mathur has been running independent animal-plant interactions research lab since 2011 at Sri Venkateswara College. Mathur has several publications in peer-reviewed journals, with a total impact of 17.66. She has authored an ecology book for undergraduate students.

Career 
Mathur has been running independent research lab Animal-Plant-Interactions Lab since 2011 with research grants obtained from SERB, UGC, NAM S&T Centre, University of Delhi, Nuffic, Eureka Forbes and PI industries. She is the research advisor for Department of Pulmonary Medicine and Sleep Disorders, AIIMS, New Delhi. She is also the Associate editor for Biojournal, member of International Society of Chemical Ecology(ISCE) and reviewer in International journals of high repute.

Mathur started her career as an assistant professor in 2003 at Daulat Ram College, University of Delhi. She then moved to Sri Venkateswara College and has been teaching there since as Assistant Professor, in the Department of Zoology.

Selected publications
 Pasricha, S., Mathur, V.*, Garg, A., Lenka, S., Verma, K., & Agarwal, S. (2021). Molecular mechanisms underlying heavy metal uptake, translocation and tolerance in hyperaccumulators-an analysis: Heavy metal tolerance in hyperaccumulators. Environmental Challenges, 100197 (https://doi.org/10.1016/j.envc.2021.100197).
Sharma, G., Malthankar, P.A., and Mathur, V.* (2021). Insect-Plant Interactions: A Multilayered Relationship. Annals of the Entomological Society of America: saaa032 (doi.org/10.1093/aesa/saaa032)
Sharma, G., and Mathur, V.* (2020). Modulation of insect-induced oxidative stress responses by microbial fertilizers in Brassica juncea. FEMS Microbiology Ecology, 96(4): fiaa040. [ISSN 1574-6941 (Online); ISSN 0168-6496 (Print)]
Sharma G., Rahul, Guleria R. and Mathur V. (2019). Differences in plant metabolites and microbes associated with Azadirachta indica with variation in air pollution. Environmental Pollution (In press). DOI: 10.1016/j.envpol.2019.113595. (ISSN no. 0269-7491).
Kituta, J.A.R., Sharma G. and Mathur, V.* (2019). Effect of environmentally sustainable microbial fertilizer on Insect-induced plant responses. Environment Conservation Journal 20(3): 1-11. (ISSN no. 0972-3099).
Sharma G, Anjulo MT and Mathur, V.* (2019). Microbial fertilizer improves constitutive and induced resistance of tomato against a generalist insect. International Journal of Zoology and Animal Biology 2(1): 000135.
 van Dam, N.M., Wondafrash, M., Mathur, V. and Tytgat, T.O.G. (2018). Differences in hormonal signaling triggered by two root-feeding nematode species result in contrasting effects on aphid population growth. Frontiers in Ecology and Evolution 6: 88 (doi: 10.3389/fevo.2018.00088).
Mathur V. and Sharma G. (2016). Do microbial fertilizers increase immunity in Indian mustard (Brassica juncea) against insects?  Natural resource management: Ecological perspectives: Vol.2. Proceedings of the Indian Ecological society International Conference, Sher-e-kashmir University of Agricultural Sciences and Technology of Jammu (SKUAST), India, 716..
 Rai A., Imran, Tora M.A., Sharma G., Azerefegne F. and Mathur V.* (2016). Effect of phosphate solubilizing bacteria on constitutive and induced responses of tomato (Lycopersicum esculantum) against tobacco cutworm (Spodoptera litura Fab) (Lepidoptera: Noctuidae). Natural resource management:  Ecological perspectives: Vol.2. Proceedings of the Indian Ecological Society International Conference, Sher-e-kashmir University of Agricultural Sciences and Technology of Jammu (SKUAST), India, 759..
Mathur, V., Tytgat, T.O.G., Reddy, A.S., Vet, L.E.M. and van Dam, N.M. (2014). Temporal specificity in insect- induced responses of Brassica juncea (Brassicaceae). Biojournal 9: 1-21. (ISSN no. 0970-9444).
Mathur, V., Tytgat, T.O.G., Hordijk, C.A., Harhangi, H.R., Jansen, J.J., Reddy, A.S., Harvey, J.A., Vet, L.E.M. and van Dam, N.M. (2013). An ecogenomic analysis of herbivore 1.   induced plant volatiles in Brassica juncea. Molecular Ecology 22 (24): 6179–6196.(ISSN no. 1365-294X).
Mathur, V., Wagenaar, R., Caissard, J.C., Reddy, A.S., Vet, L.E.M., Cortesero, A.M. and van Dam, N.M. (2013). A novel indirect defence in Brassicaceae: Structure and function of extrafloral nectaries in Brassica juncea. Plant, Cell and Environment 36 (3): 528–541. (Cover page article of the issue). (ISSN no. 1365-3040).
Mathur, V., Tytgat, T.O.G., de Graaf, R., Kalia, V., Reddy, A.S., Vet, L.E.M. and van Dam, N.M. (2013). Dealing with double trouble: Consequences of single and double herbivory in Brassica juncea. Chemoecology 23: 71–82. [ISSN no. 0937-7409 (Print) 1423-0445 (Online)].
Mathur, V., Ganta, S., Raaijmakers, C. E., Reddy, A. S., Vet, L. E. M. & van Dam, N. M. (2011) Temporal dynamics of herbivore-induced responses in Brassica juncea and their effect on generalist and specialist herbivores. Entomologia Experimentalis et Applicata 139(3): 215–225.(ISSN no. 1570-7458).
 Qiu, B., Liu, L., Li, X-Xi., Mathur, V., Qin, Z-Q. and Ren, S-X. (2009). Genetic mutations associated with chemical resistance in the cytochrome P450 genes of invasive and native Bemisia tabaci (Hemiptera: Aleyrodidae) populations in China. Insect Science 16: 237–245.(ISSN no. 1744-7917).
 Qiu, B., Chen, Y.P., Liu, L., Peng, W.L., Li, X.X., Ahmed, M.Z., Mathur, V., Du, Y.Z. and Ren, S.X. (2009). Identification of three major Bemisia tabaci biotypes in China based on morphological and DNA polymorphisms. Progress in Natural Science 19: 713–718. [ISSN no. 1002-0071 (Print), 1745-5391 (Online)].

Books

 El-Gendy, N.S. and Mathur, V. (eds.) Air Pollution and Public Health: Challenges, Interventions and Sustainable Solutions, Allied Publishers Pvt. Ltd. 
Pandey, B.N. and Mathur, V. (2018). Biology of chordates. PHI Learning Pvt. Ltd. New Delhi, India. .
Mathur, V. (2012). Temporal dynamics of induced responses in Brassica juncea. PhD thesis, Wageningen University, Wageningen, NL, with references, and summaries in Dutch and English. .
Mathur, V. (2010). Environmental Ecology and Field Biology: Applied aspects. IK Publishing House, New Delhi, India. .

Book chapters and e-chapters

Verma, K. and Mathur, V.* (2020). Effect of air polycyclic aromatic hydrocarbons in food chain: direct and indirect exposure. In El-Gendy, N.S. and Mathur, V. (eds.) Air Pollution and Public Health: Challenges, Interventions and Sustainable Solutions, Allied Publishers Pvt. Ltd. Pp. 141-156. 
Mathur V.* and Sharma, G. (2019). Endosymbionts of Plants and Marine organisms: A Search for Lung Cancer Drug. Proceedings of International Workshop on Drug Development from Herbs and Marine Medicinal Materials (accepted).
 Guleria, R., Mathur V.* and Dhanuka, A. (2019). Health effects of changing environment. In Peshin R. and Dhawan A.K. (eds) Natural Resource Management: Ecological Perspectives, Springer International Publishing, Switzerland AG. pp 95–108. doi: 978-3-319-99767-4.
Mathur, V.*, Javid, L., Kulshrestha, S., Mandal, A., Reddy, A.A. (2017). World cultivation of genetically modified crops: Opportunities and risks. In Lichtfouse E. (ed) Sustainable Agriculture Reviews. Springer International Publishing, Cham, pp 45–87. doi:10.1007/978-3-319-58679-3_2.
Mathur, V.* and Tytgat, T.O.G. (2016). Plant parasitic nematodes. E-chapter of the paper ‘Biology of Parasitism’ in the online postgraduate course prepared for NME-ICT, MHRD, Govt. of India.
Mathur, V.* and Tytgat, T.O.G. (2016). Nematode plant interaction. E-chapter of the paper ‘Biology of Parasitism’ in the online postgraduate course prepared for NME-ICT, MHRD, Govt. of India.

References

External links 
 Website

1979 births
People from New Delhi
Academic staff of Delhi University
Living people